Cranfillia fullagari, synonym Blechnum fullagarii, is a fern in the family Blechnaceae. The specific epithet honours James Fullagar, who collected plants on Lord Howe Island for the Royal Botanic Gardens, Melbourne.

Description
The plant is a terrestrial or lithophytic fern. The prominent rhizome has narrow and twisted apical scales. Its fronds are 30–50 cm long and 8–14 cm wide.

Taxonomy
The species was first described in 1874 by Ferdinand von Mueller in the genus Lomaria. Although Mueller spelt the name Lomaria fullageri, using an e in the epithet, he referred to the surname "Fullagar". In 1905, Carl Christensen transferred the species to Blechnum, spelling the epithet fullagari. The spelling fullagarii is found in some sources; Article 60.8 of the International Code of Nomenclature for algae, fungi, and plants only allows the use of a single "i" with names ending in "er" not "ar". In 2016, André Luís de Gasper and Vinícius Antonio de Oliveira Dittrich transferred the species to Cranfillia as Cranfillia fullagari.

Distribution and habitat
The fern is endemic to Australia's subtropical Lord Howe Island in the Tasman Sea. It is restricted to the cloud forest on the summit of Mount Gower.

References

Blechnaceae
Endemic flora of Lord Howe Island
Plants described in 1874
Ferns of Australia
Taxa named by Ferdinand von Mueller